Armand M. Arabian (December 12, 1934 – March 28, 2018) was an American lawyer who served as Associate Justice of the Supreme Court of California from February 3, 1990, to February 28, 1996.

Early life and education
Armand was born in New York City to John and Aghavnie (née Yalian) Arabian, who had immigrated from Armenia following the 1915 Armenian genocide. Arabian received a B.A. in Psychology from Boston University in 1956. He served as a lieutenant in the U.S. Army from 1956 to 1958. After his discharge, he obtained a J.D. from Boston University School of Law in 1961, and a LL.M. from the University of Southern California Law Center in 1970.

Legal and judicial career
Before his appointment to the court, Arabian was a Los Angeles County Deputy District Attorney, 1962-1963, and an attorney in private practice in Van Nuys, California, 1963-1972. In 1972, Arabian was appointed by Governor Ronald Reagan as a Los Angeles Municipal Court Judge, where he served one year. Arabian was then elevated by Governor Reagan to the Los Angeles County Superior Court, where he presided from 1973 to 1983.

In 1979, Arabian's initial appointment to the Court of Appeals  was the subject of controversy: "When California Governor Jerry Brown left the state to campaign for the presidency in 1979, Lieutenant Governor Mike Curb appointed Armand Arabian to the court of appeal, knowing well that Brown intended to appoint someone else. When Brown returned, he withdrew Arabian's appointment and made his own. The ensuing dispute made it to the state supreme court, which ruled both the appointment and the withdrawal legal." Four years later, Governor George Deukmejian officially appointed Arabian an associate justice of the California Court of Appeal, Second District, where he served from 1983 to 1990.

In 1990, Deukmejian appointed Arabian the 105th justice to the California Supreme Court, where he served until his retirement in 1996. As a jurist, Arabian was known as a law-and-order conservative.

On the court, he was leader in the reform of California rape laws. In a 1973 criminal trial, Arabian declined to instruct the jury to treat skeptically the victim's testimony—to the effect that a rape charge "is easily made and, once made, difficult to defend against"—an instruction the state Supreme Court had ruled was mandatory. In 1994, Arabian wrote the unanimous opinion in People v. Iniguez (1994), which held that a sexual assault without struggle can be deemed rape, instead of the lesser crime of sexual battery.

Since stepping down from the bench, Arabian has worked as a mediator and arbitrator. He has also served on the Board of Visitors at Pepperdine University School of Law.

Honors and awards
Arabian has received numerous honors and awards. In 1973, the Armenian Professional Society conferred on him its annual Achievement Award. In 1981, Arabian received Boston University School of Law's Silver Shingle Award for Distinguished Service to the Legal Profession, and in 1990, he was awarded the Distinguished Alumni Award from Boston University.  In 2011, Arabian was honored with the Lifetime Achievement Award of the San Fernando Valley Bar Association's Community Legal Foundation. Arabian was given honorary Doctor of Law degrees by several law schools, including: Southwestern School Law, 1990; Pepperdine University, 1990; University of West Los Angeles, 1994; Thomas Jefferson School of Law, 1997; and American College Law, 2001.

Personal life
On August 26, 1962, he married Nancy Megurian (February 17, 1939 – July 21, 2016) in Los Angeles, California. They had two children: a daughter, Allison Ann Demurjian, and a son, Robert Armand Arabian, who is also an attorney. He died on March 28, 2018 at the age of 83.

Selected publications

--- (2010). The Sexual Assault Counselor-Victim Privilege: Jurisdictional Delay into an Unclaimed Sanctuary, 37 Pepp. L. Rev. 5, an update of his earlier article, "The Cautionary Instruction in Sex Cases: A Lingering Insult," 10 Sw. L. Rev. 585 (1985).

--- (November 1995). "Condos, Cats and CC&R's: Invasion of the Castle Common," 23 Pepperdine L. Rev. 1.

Photos and video
 Photo of Armand Arabian, January 10, 2011, at his Van Nuys, California, law office.

See also

 List of justices of the Supreme Court of California
 Marvin R. Baxter

References

External links
 Armand Arabian biography. California State Courts.
 Armand Arabian. California Supreme Court Historical Society.
 Court opinions authored by Armand Arabian. Courtlistener.com.
 Past & Present Justices. California State Courts.
 Former Justices. California Court of Appeal, Second District.

1934 births
2018 deaths
American legal writers
American people of Armenian descent
Boston University College of Arts and Sciences alumni
Boston University School of Law alumni
California Republicans
Justices of the Supreme Court of California
Lawyers from Los Angeles
Lawyers from New York City
Military personnel from New York City
Superior court judges in the United States
USC Gould School of Law alumni
20th-century American judges
20th-century American lawyers
United States Army officers